The Perry Community School District is a rural public school district headquartered in Perry, Iowa.

The district is mostly in northern Dallas County, with a smaller area in Boone County, and a small portion of Greene County.  The district serves Perry and the surrounding rural areas, including the towns of Dawson and Bouton.

Clark Wicks has been superintendent since 2017, after serving as the part-time superintendent at Orient-Macksburg Community School District.  He formerly served as the principal at Perry Elementary from 1989 to 2012.

Schools
 Perry Elementary School
 Perry Middle School
 Perry High School

Perry High School

Athletics 
The Bluejays compete in the Raccoon River Conference in the following sports:

Fall Sports
Cross Country (boys and girls)
Swimming (girls)
Volleyball (girls)
Football

Winter Sports
Basketball (boys and girls)
 Boys' - 1988 Class 2A State Champions 
 Girls' - 2-time State Champions (1930, 2002) 
Wrestling 
Swimming (boys)

Spring Sports
Track and Field (boys and girls)
 Boys' - 1962 Class A State Champions
Golf (boys and girls)
 Boys' - 1983 Class 3A State Champions
Tennis (boys and girls)
Soccer (girls)
Baseball
Softball

Notable alumni 

 Sam Brinton

See also
List of school districts in Iowa
List of high schools in Iowa

References

External links
 Perry Community School District

School districts in Iowa
Education in Dallas County, Iowa
Education in Boone County, Iowa
Education in Greene County, Iowa